Tylostigma is a genus of flowering plants from the orchid family, Orchidaceae, endemic to Madagascar.

Species 

 Tylostigma filiforme H.Perrier, 1951
 Tylostigma foliosum Schltr., 1923
 Tylostigma herminioides Schltr., 1924
 Tylostigma hildebrandtii (Ridl.) Schltr., 1924
 Tylostigma madagascariense Schltr., 1916
 Tylostigma nigrescens Schltr., 1916
 Tylostigma perrieri Schltr., 1916
 Tylostigma tenellum Schltr., 1924

See also 
 List of Orchidaceae genera

References 

Orchids of Madagascar
Orchideae genera
Orchideae